Hotel High Range is a 1968 Indian Malayalam-language spy thriller film, directed and produced by P. Subramaniam. The film stars Sharada, Ramakrishna, Thikkurissy Sukumaran Nair, Kallayam Krishnadas and Aranmula Ponnamma. It was released on 28 June 1968.

Plot

Cast 

Sharada as Nalini
Thikkurissy Sukumaran Nair as Rajasahib
Kallayam Krishnadas
Aranmula Ponnamma as Ramesh's mother
Bahadoor
Jyothi
Kottarakkara Sreedharan Nair as Dhanesh
Nellikode Bhaskaran
Paravoor Bharathan as Vasu
Ramakrishna as Ramesh
S. P. Pillai as Velu Pilla
K. V. Shanthi as Madhumathi/Gracy

Soundtrack 
The music is composed by G. Devarajan, and lyrics were written by Vayalar Ramavarma.

References

External links 
 

1960s Malayalam-language films
1960s spy thriller films
1968 films
Films directed by P. Subramaniam
Indian spy thriller films